Riedelia is a genus of flies in the family Tachinidae.

Species
Picconia derisa (Reinhard, 1943)
Picconia incurva (Zetterstedt, 1844)
Picconia manca Herting, 1973
Picconia tenuiseta (Herting, 1973)

References

Diptera of North America
Diptera of Europe
Diptera of Asia
Exoristinae
Tachinidae genera
Taxa named by Jean-Baptiste Robineau-Desvoidy